Subglacial volcanoes are volcanoes that have formed when lava erupts beneath glacial ice. They are somewhat rare worldwide, being confined to regions that are or were covered by continental ice sheets.

Antarctica
Brown Bluff

Argentina
Viedma

Canada
Ash Mountain
Mount Brew
Caribou Tuya
Cauldron Dome
Chakatah Creek Peak
Dark Mountain
Dome Mountain
Ember Ridge
Enid Creek Cone
Gage Hill
Hyalo Ridge
Isspah Butte
Mount Josephine
Kawdy Mountain
King Creek Cone
Klinkit Creek Peak
Klinkit Lake Peak
Little Bear Mountain
Little Eagle Cone
Little Ring Mountain
Mathews Tuya
McLeod Hill
Meehaz Mountain
Mosquito Mound
Nuthinaw Mountain
Pillow Ridge
Pyramid Mountain
Ray Mountain
Ring Mountain
South Tuya
Spanish Mump
Tennena Cone
The Table
Tom MacKay Creek Cone
Toozaza Peak
Tsekone Ridge
Tutsingale Mountain
Tuya Butte
Watts Point volcanic centre
Wetalth Ridge

Iceland
Bárðarbunga
Prestahnúkur
Herðubreið
Hlöðufell
Hofsjökull
Hveravellir
Katla
Kverkfjöll
Snæfellsjökull
Stóra-Björnsfell
Thorolfsfell
Torfajökull
Tungnafellsjökull
Vífilsfell
Grímsvötn
Loki-Fögrufjöll
Thordarhyrna

United States
Hayrick Butte
Hogg Rock
Lone Butte

See also
List of shield volcanoes
List of stratovolcanoes

 Subglacial